HD 81040 is a star in the equatorial constellation of Leo. With an apparent visual magnitude of +7.73 it is too dim to be visible to the naked eye but can be viewed with a small telescope. The star is located at a distance of 112 light years from the Sun based on parallax. It is drifting further away with a radial velocity of +49 km/s, having come to within  some 527,000 years ago.

Properties 
This is an ordinary G-type main-sequence star with a stellar classification of G0V. The Sun somewhat dwarfs HD 81040 in terms of physical characteristics: it has 87% of the Sun's mass and 91% of the radius of the Sun. It is spinning with a projected rotational velocity of 5.3 km/s, and has near solar metallicity. The age of the star is not precisely known; the ELODIE spectrograph suggested 0.8 Gyr and found it to have a young dust disk. Later measurements by modelling chromosperic activity suggested an age of 4.18 Gyr.


Planetary system 
On November 24, 2005, a superjovian planet was announced by Sozzetti et al. It was discovered using the radial velocity method. Astrometric measurements using Gaia, published in several papers, show that the inclination of its orbit is about 111 degrees, so its true mass is somewhat higher than that predicted from its minimum mass.

See also 
 List of extrasolar planets

References

External links 
 The Extrasolar Planets Encyclopaedia: HD 81040

G-type main-sequence stars
Planetary systems with one confirmed planet
Circumstellar disks
Leo (constellation)
Durchmusterung objects
081040
046070